Samar Ali Khan is a Pakistani politician who had been a Member of the Provincial Assembly of Sindh from May 2013 to May 2018. He is married to Atiqa Odho

Early life and education

He was born on 11 July 1955 in Murree.

He has a degree of Bachelor of Architecture from University of Houston.

Political career

He was elected to the Provincial Assembly of Sindh as a candidate of Pakistan Tehreek-e-Insaf from Constituency PS-113 Karachi-XXV in 2013 Pakistani general election.

In May 2018, he announced to end his political career.

References

Living people
Sindh MPAs 2013–2018
1955 births
Pakistan Tehreek-e-Insaf politicians
University of Houston alumni
People from Murree
Recipients of Sitara-i-Imtiaz